Leilani Sarelle Figalan is an American actress best known for her role as Roxy in the 1992 film Basic Instinct.

Filmography

Film

Television

References

External links
 

Living people
20th-century American actresses
21st-century American actresses
American film actresses
American television actresses
People from Valencia, Santa Clarita, California
Year of birth missing (living people)